Children’s Studio School is a non-profit arts organization and full-day school of the arts and architecture in Washington, D.C., United States.

History
In 1977, Children’s Studio School started as a school where young children (three–five years old) of diverse abilities, learning styles, and economic and cultural backgrounds work in studios with artists and architects as a total means of education.

Mission 
The organization’s mission is to develop divergent and multidimensional capabilities of thinking, acting, knowing, and intercultural understanding in young children for navigating the complex world in which they live.

See also 
List of architecture schools
List of art schools

References

External links 
Official website

Education in Washington, D.C.